Ẓāhirī is a school of thought in Islamic jurisprudence.

Zahiri may also refer to:

Places 

Zahiri, Iran, a village in Khuzestan Province, Iran
Zehiriyeh, a village in Khuzestan Province, Iran

People 
al-Andalusī aẓ-Ẓāhirī, alias Ibn Hazm, 10th-century Andalusian philosopher, litterateur, psychologist, historian, jurist and theologian
Zahir-al-Din Fariyabi, 12th-century Persian poet
Jamel Zahiri (born 1985), French-born Moroccan football forward
Mohamed Obaid Al-Zahiri, football player from the United Arab Emirates